Trùng Khánh is a township and capital of Trùng Khánh District, Cao Bằng Province, Vietnam.

References

Populated places in Cao Bằng province
District capitals in Vietnam
Townships in Vietnam